Nobilissimus (Latin for "most noble"), in Byzantine Greek nōbelissimos (Greek: νωβελίσσιμος), was one of the highest imperial titles in the late Roman and Byzantine empires. The feminine form of the title was nobilissima.

History and functions

The term nobilissimus originated as an epithet to the title of Caesar, whose holder was the Roman and Byzantine emperor's heir-apparent and who would, after Geta in 198, be addressed nobilissimus Caesar. According to the historian Zosimus, Emperor Constantine the Great (r. 306–337) first created the nobilissimus into a separate dignity, so as to honour some of his relatives without implying a claim to the imperial throne. The title thus came to be awarded to members of the imperial family, coming in rank immediately after that of Caesar, and remained so throughout the early and middle Byzantine period, until the mid-11th century. In the Klētorologion of Philotheos, written in 899, the rank's insignia are described as a purple tunic, mantle and belt, indicating the exalted position of its holder. Their award by the emperor in a special ceremony signified the elevation of the recipient to the office.

From the late 11th century, the title was given to senior army commanders, the future Byzantine emperor Alexios Komnenos being the first to be thus honoured. The inflation of its holders during the Komnenian period led to its devaluation, and the new titles of prōtonōbelissimos (πρωτονωβελίσσιμος, "first nobilissimus") and prōtonōbelissimohypertatos (πρωτονωβελισσιμοϋπέρτατος, "supreme first nobilissimus") were created in the 12th century. nobilissimus puer referred to "most noble child".

Nobilissimi
Hannibalianus
Varronianus
Gratian
Valentinianus Galates
Valentinian III
Justinian I
Martinos
Bagrat IV of Georgia
George II of Georgia
Alexios I Komnenos
Robert Guiscard
Tzachas

References

Sources
 
 
 

Ancient Roman titles
Byzantine imperial titles
Byzantine court titles